Torpex Games was a game development studio located in Bellevue, Washington, United States.

The studio was notable because their video game Schizoid was the first Xbox Live Arcade title to utilize the Microsoft framework, XNA Game Studio Express.

Torpex Games was founded by industry veterans Bill Dugan and Jamie Fristrom.

Games 
Schizoid (2008)
Bejeweled Blitz LIVE (2011)

References

External links 
Torpex Games Website

Video game companies of the United States
American companies established in 2005
Video game companies established in 2005
2005 establishments in Washington (state)
Companies based in Washington (state)
American companies disestablished in 2012
Video game companies disestablished in 2012
2012 disestablishments in Washington (state)